Orgeval is the name of two communes in France:
 Orgeval, Aisne
 Orgeval, Yvelines